Stefano Sensi (born 5 August 1995) is an Italian professional footballer who plays as a midfielder for  club Monza, on loan from  club Inter Milan, and the Italy national team.

He began his career with Italian side Cesena in 2013, and was subsequently loaned out to San Marino for two seasons before returning to the club. He joined Sassuolo in January 2016, and was promptly loaned out to Cesena for the remainder of the season. He became a Sassuolo player in summer 2016. Sensi was loaned out to Inter Milan in summer 2019, and joined them on a permanent basis in the following year. Inter loaned him out to Sampdoria and Monza in 2022.

Club career

Youth career
Born in Urbino in the Marche, Sensi started to play football with the local team Urbania at the age of six. During this time at the club, he played with his older brother. While at Urbania, he was spotted by a Rimini scout, joining the youth team in 2007. He spent three years in Rimini, until the end of the 2009–10 season when the club bankrupted, releasing all the players. Sensi was taken by the youth academy of the local rivals Cesena.

Cesena
Sensi began his senior career with Cesena. He was first included in a matchday squad for their Coppa Italia fourth-round game on 28 November 2012, remaining unused in a 3–1 loss to Atalanta at the Stadio Atleti Azzurri d'Italia.

On 23 July 2013, he was one of a quintet of Cesena players who moved to San Marino Calcio, in his case a loan with the option of co-ownership. He made his professional debut on 8 September, playing the full 90 minutes of a 2–0 Lega Pro Seconda Divisione loss away to Reggiana. A week later he scored his first goal, finishing from the edge of the penalty area to conclude a 2–0 win over Como at the Stadio Olimpico. On 16 March 2014, he was one of three Titani players sent off in a 2–0 defeat at Cremonese. He played 26 games in his first professional season, scoring another goal in the last game, a 2–2 home draw with Vicenza on 4 May.

San Marino did not take up the option to obtain Sensi, but on 7 July 2014 he went to the club for a second loan. In his second match of the season, on 8 September, he was sent off in added time at the end of a 2–1 loss at Pontedera. He played 33 games in a season which ended with relegation to Serie D, scoring eight goals, including two in a 3–2 home win over L'Aquila on 14 February 2015, in which he was again sent off at the end.

Sensi made his Cesena debut on 20 August 2015, playing the entirety of their 4–1 win at Catania in the third round of the Coppa Italia. On 5 September, he made his league debut, as the team won 2–0 against Brescia at the Stadio Dino Manuzzi in the first game of the season. On 3 October he scored from a penalty as Cesena defeated Livorno 1–0.

Sassuolo
On 13 January 2016, Sensi was signed by Serie A club Sassuolo. He would spend the first 6 months of the contract on loan with Cesena. He returned in Sassuolo in July 2016 ahead of 2016–17 season, making his Serie A debut by playing full 90 minutes in the opening championship match against Palermo, which ended in a 1–0 away win. His first top flight goal came later in October 2016 in a 2–1 home win over newly promoted side Crotone. Sensi concluded his first season at Mapei Stadium by playing 19 matches in all competitions, scoring only once. In the 2017–18 season, he scored two goals in 17 league appearances. Sensi was a protagonist in the 2018–19 season under manager Roberto De Zerbi, making 30 appearances between league and cup, netting twice in the process.

Inter Milan
On 2 July 2019, Inter Milan officially announced that Stefano Sensi had been signed from Sassuolo on an initial paid loan deal, with an option to buy at the end of the season. The total cost of the operation is expected to reach €25 million. Sensi made his club debut on 26 August in a 4–0 home win against Lecce, in Inter's opening match of the 2019–20 Serie A season; he marked the occasion by scoring a goal, but later came off in the second half for Roberto Gagliardini. Sensi made his Champions League debut on 17 September in a 1–1 home draw against Slavia Prague; he contributed to Inter's injury-time equaliser, as his free kick struck the cross-bar, and was subsequently turned in by Nicolò Barella to tie the game. Starting from January, he picked a series of injuries that effectively ruled him out of the latter half of the 2019–20 season. 

On 31 August 2020, Inter exercised the buyout clause in his contract and Sensi signed a four-year deal with the club.

Loan to Sampdoria
On 29 January 2022, Sensi moved on loan to Sampdoria.

Loan to Monza
On 2 July 2022, Sensi joined newly-promoted Serie A side Monza on a one-year loan. He made his debut on 8 August, as a substitute in a 3–2 Coppa Italia win against Frosinone. Sensi's first goal for the biancorossi came on 11 September, scoring from a direct free kick against Lecce. The match eventually finished in a 1–1 draw, which gave Monza their first-ever Serie A point.

International career
Sensi has represented Italy at youth level, making one appearance for the under-17 side, and making his debut for the under-20 side in a 2–2 draw against Poland on 7 October 2015.

On 20 November 2018 he made his debut with the Italy senior team, playing as a starter in a 1–0 friendly victory over the United States, held in Genk. On 26 March 2019, Sensi scored his first goal for the national team in a 6–0 home win over Liechtenstein in a UEFA Euro 2020 qualifying match.

In June 2021, he was initially included in Italy's final 26–man squad for UEFA Euro 2020 by manager Roberto Mancini; however, he was later ruled out of the tournament after sustaining an injury during training, and Matteo Pessina was called up to the tournament in his place.

Style of play
A former offensive or central midfielder, with noted vision, good technique, and an eye for goal, Sensi now usually functions in a defensive or creative midfield role for his team. He often acts as a deep-lying playmaker in front of the back-line, due to his ball control, range of distribution, and long passing ability with both feet in spite of being naturally right-footed, which allows him to create chances for teammates; he is also capable of playing in several other midfield and offensive positions, and has been deployed as a winger, as a mezzala, or as a supporting forward. Already regarded as one of the most promising young Italian footballers of his generation, Sensi has drawn the attention of larger clubs, and his playing style, mobility, small stature, and low centre of gravity have drawn comparisons with Marco Verratti, as well as Andrea Pirlo, although he has personally stated that his main influence is Spanish playmaker Xavi. Sensi has also been praised by Italy manager Roberto Mancini, who described him as: "...good, technically gifted, and fast", also noting that "...he has character." In spite of his slender build, which makes him ineffective at winning more physical challenges for the ball, he is also effective defensively due to his tactical intelligence and interpretation of space. Despite his ability, however, he has often struggled with injuries throughout his career.

Career statistics

Club

International

Scores and results list Italy's goal tally first, score column indicates score after each Sensi goal.

Honours
Inter Milan
 Serie A: 2020–21
 Supercoppa Italiana: 2021
 UEFA Europa League runner-up: 2019–20

Notes

References

External links
 Profile at A.C. Monza 
 

1995 births
Living people
People from Urbino
Sportspeople from the Province of Pesaro and Urbino
Footballers from Marche
Italian footballers
Association football midfielders
A.C. Cesena players
A.S.D. Victor San Marino players
U.S. Sassuolo Calcio players
Inter Milan players
U.C. Sampdoria players
A.C. Monza players
Serie A players
Serie B players
Serie C players
Italy youth international footballers
Italy international footballers